The Mummy of San Andrés is a human mummy belonging to the Guanche culture, who were the ancient inhabitants of the Canary Islands, Spain.

It is one of the best preserved Guanche mummies, and is one of the few that has a proper name, Mummy of San Andrés. The appellation refers to the place where the male specimen was discovered, similar to how the mummies of the swamps in northern Europe were named after local toponyms (Lindow Man, Grauballe Man and Tollund Man, among others).

The mummy is a male of about 25 to 30 years partially covered with goatskin with 6 strips that surround it. It was found in a cave in a ravine outside the village of San Andrés. The mummy was found in the Anaga massif, an area on the island of Tenerife that is rich in archaeological finds. It is thought that the mummy might have been that of a Mencey (aboriginal king), or a leading figure in Guanche society of the time.

The exact year of the mummy's discovery is unknown. The specimen was kept at the Museo Municipal of Santa Cruz de Tenerife until 1958, when the mummy became part of the collections of the Museum of Nature and Man (Museo de la Naturaleza y el Hombre) of Santa Cruz de Tenerife, where it currently is. It is considered the best Guanche mummy preserved in the museum, and the most representative.

Data on the mummy 

 Gender: male.
 Age: 25 to 30 years or so.
 Culture: Guanche.
 Type of mummification: mummy ceremonial.
 Type of burial: burial cave.
 Location: Anaga (Tenerife).
 Shown at: The Museum of Nature and Man (Santa Cruz de Tenerife), along with other Guanche mummies preserved.
 Interesting facts: Found on a wooden board (now this plate not displayed to the public).

See also 
Guanche mummies of Necochea

References 
The mystery of the guanche mummies (in Spanish)

Guanche mummies
Guanche people
Archaeological discoveries in Spain